Sangre de Cristo Ranches is an unincorporated community located near Fort Garland in Costilla County, Colorado, United States.  The U.S. Post Office at Fort Garland (ZIP Code 81133) serves Sangre de Cristo Ranches postal addresses.

Geography
Sangre de Cristo Ranches is located at  (37.389058,-105.335981).
Sangre de Cristo Ranches is a private, rural subdivision located in the heart of the Sangre de Cristo Mountain range in Southern Colorado. The ranches are located in Costilla County.
Forbes, Inc. developed this area and began selling lots in 1971 and finished the sales operation around 2000.

See also
 List of cities and towns in Colorado

References

External links
Sangre De Cristo Ranches Homeowners Association

Unincorporated communities in Costilla County, Colorado
Unincorporated communities in Colorado